Anton Rizov (born 29 December 1987) is a Bulgarian sports shooter. He competed in the Men's 10 metre air rifle, men's 50 metre rifle 3 positions and men's 50 metre rifle prone events at the 2012 and 2016 Summer Olympics.

References

External links
 

1987 births
Living people
Bulgarian male sport shooters
Olympic shooters of Bulgaria
Shooters at the 2012 Summer Olympics
Shooters at the 2016 Summer Olympics
People from Sandanski
European Games competitors for Bulgaria
Shooters at the 2015 European Games
Shooters at the 2019 European Games
Sportspeople from Blagoevgrad Province
21st-century Bulgarian people